Chenega Bay Airport  is a state-owned public-use airport located one nautical mile (1.85 km) northeast of the central business district of Chenega, in the Valdez-Cordova Census Area of the U.S. state of Alaska.

Facilities 
It has one runway designated 15/33 with a gravel surface measuring is 3,000 by 75 feet (914 x 23 m).

Airlines and destinations

References

External links
 FAA Alaska airport diagram (GIF)
 Resources for this airport:
 
 
 

Airports in Chugach Census Area, Alaska